Choi Yong-jin may refer to:
 Choi Yong-jin (athlete)
 Choi Yong-jin (speed skater)